Gymnastics events have been staged at the Olympic Games since 1896. British female gymnasts have participated in every Summer Olympics since 1928, except for 1932. British women have won four medals at the Olympics: the 1928 team all-around bronze; the 2012 uneven bars bronze, which was won by Beth Tweddle; the 2016 floor exercise bronze, won by Amy Tinkler; and the 2021 team all-around bronze. Tweddle and Pat Hirst are the only British female gymnasts who have competed in at least three Olympics.

Gymnasts

Medalists

References

Great Britain
Olympic
gymnasts